The Legislature of the Virgin Islands is the territorial legislature of the United States Virgin Islands. The legislative branch of the unincorporated U.S. territory is unicameral, with a single house consisting of 15 senators, elected to two-year terms without term limits. The legislature meets in Charlotte Amalie on the island of St. Thomas.

History

The Danish period: 1852–1917 
The roots of the modern legislature date to the passage of the Colonial Law in 1852 during the Danish colonial period. The law created a Colonial Assembly for the Danish West Indies, as well as the appointment of a vice-regent serving as the colony's governor executive, serving on behalf of the King of Denmark. Despite the name, the Colonial Assembly acted more as an advisory body than a true legislature. Vice-regents continued to reserve the right to reject or amend any law they did not see fit.

A further Colonial Law coming in 1863 broke the Assembly into two parts, creating a colonial council for the newly created St. Thomas and St. John Municipality, and a separate colonial council for the St. Croix Municipality. The 1863 law provided the councils to combine into a single legislature when called upon by the Vice-regent or by legislators themselves, and gave legislators greater say in the colony's finances. However, the Danish monarch still reserved the right to pick several members of the councils, giving Copenhagen a continued say in the colony's legislative affairs. The monarch-appointed vice-regent and the king also continued to reserve the right to pass or deny any colonial bills brought upon their desks. The voting franchise of this period remained low, hovering just under six percent.

The American period: 1917–present 

Upon the U.S. purchase of the islands from Denmark in 1917 by fears of German expansion into the Caribbean, the renamed U.S. Virgin Islands government underwent a gradual overhaul. From 1917 to 1931, the U.S. Navy administered the islands, with a Navy officer serving gubernatorial duties, while the colonial councils for the territory's two municipalities created by the Danes fifty years earlier remained with little change. Islanders were granted American citizenship in 1927, and after popular discontent with incompetent naval rule, the islands came under the supervision of the federal Department of the Interior in 1931.

The U.S. Congress's passage of the 1936 Organic Act brought the greatest amount of self-government the islands had ever known. For the first time, all islanders above the age of 21 enjoyed universal suffrage. The colonial councils—now municipal councils—could combine when desired to form a Legislative Assembly. The Legislative Assembly now could override gubernatorial vetoes with a two-thirds majority, a parliamentary procedure endowed to the U.S. Congress and various state legislatures. The federal Congress and President, however, continued to  reserve the right to veto territorial legislation.

Modern legislature 
The Revised Organic Act of the Virgin Islands of 1954 dissolved the two Municipal Councils, creating a permanent unified and unicameral Legislature of the Virgin Islands. A revision in the territory's constitution in 1966 increased the number of legislators from its original amount of 11 to 15.

Today, the Legislature of the Virgin Islands is a territorial legislative body with the same rights and powers comparable to that of many state legislatures within the United States.

Legislature Building
The senate's home is the Legislature Building, a historic building built in 1828 as Danish police barracks, modified extensively in 1884, which is included in the Charlotte Amalie Historic District.

Legislature

The Legislature, referred to as the Senate, is a unicameral body, one of the four such legislative bodies in the United States, along with Nebraska, Guam and the District of Columbia. The Legislature meets inside the Senate Building in Charlotte Amalie, a restored Danish and American military barracks building as well as a former high school.

It is composed of 15 senators, each serving two-year terms. The territory is divided into two multimember constituencies, with seven senators representing each, elected by block voting, while a single senator from St. John is elected at large. For a long time the Legislature was the only one of its kind in the United States where the Republican Party had no representation whatsoever, until the Hawaii Senate lost its sole Republican member in 2016.

Qualifications to be a senator include being over or at least 21 years of age, a U.S. citizen, a resident of the Virgin Islands for three years, and a qualified resident of their representing district.

Current composition

Members

Source:

Past composition of the Legislature

See also
List of state and territorial capitols in the United States

References

External links
 

Government of the United States Virgin Islands
Virgin Islands
Virgin Islands United States